William Sessions may refer to:

William S. Sessions (1930–2020), American attorney, jurist and director of the FBI
William K. Sessions III (born 1947), American judge
William A. Sessions (1928–2016), American author, biographer and professor of English